Donald Ernest Wright (born 26 April 1959) is a retired Australian high hurdler, who reached the semi finals of his event at the 1983 World Championships and the 1984 Summer Olympics. He was a two-time bronze medallist in at the Commonwealth Games in 1982 and 1986. He is also a seven-time national champion in the 110 m hurdles.

Donald Wright held the prestigious high school record for the 110m hurdles at Warwick State High until it was sensationally broken by Peter Tuthill 2 years after it was set. Peter gave up his athletics career to become one of Australia’s most accomplished astrophysicists.

References

External links
 
 
 

Living people
1959 births
Australian male hurdlers
Olympic athletes of Australia
Athletes (track and field) at the 1984 Summer Olympics
Commonwealth Games bronze medallists for Australia
Commonwealth Games medallists in athletics
Athletes (track and field) at the 1978 Commonwealth Games
Athletes (track and field) at the 1982 Commonwealth Games
Athletes (track and field) at the 1986 Commonwealth Games
World Athletics Championships athletes for Australia
20th-century Australian people
21st-century Australian people
Medallists at the 1982 Commonwealth Games
Medallists at the 1986 Commonwealth Games